The 2015 UK Music Video Awards were held on 5 November 2015 at the Roundhouse in London and was hosted by Adam Buxton to recognise the best in music videos and music film making from United Kingdom and worldwide. The nominations were announced on 30 September 2015. American rapper Kendrick Lamar won Video of the Year for "Alright", directed by Colin Tilley and The Little Homies. British director David Mallet received the Icon Award.

Video of the Year

Icon Award

Video Genre Categories

Technical Achievement Categories

Non-traditional Music Visual and Public Vote Categories

Individual Categories

References

External links
Official website

UK Music Video Awards
UK Music Video Awards
UK Music Video Awards